The 2017 Kyrgyzstan League was the 26th season of Kyrgyzstan League, the Football Federation of Kyrgyz Republic's top division of association football. Alay Osh are the defending champions, having won the previous season.

Teams

Note: Table lists in alphabetical order.

League table

Results

First round

Second round

Top scorers

References

External links

Kyrgyzstan League seasons
1
Kyrgyzstan